The following is a list of released songs recorded and performed by A-Teens.

References

External links
A-Teens — Official Website
Facebook — A-Teens on Facebook

 
A-Teens